Festuca californica is a species of grass known by the common name California fescue.

This fescue species is native to the U.S. states of California and Oregon, where it is a member of many plant communities, including chaparral and oak woodlands.

Description
Festuca californica is a clumping perennial bunch grass, without rhizomes, that grows in greenish gray tufts.

The flowers are in large open sprays, in the spring and summer. The plant reproduces from seed and from buds located at the base of the clump.

Uses

Cultivation
Festuca californica is cultivated as an ornamental grass by specialty plant nurseries, for planting in traditional gardens and as a potted plant, for drought-tolerant and wildlife gardens, and for natural landscaping projects.

It is planted under Coast live oaks (Quercus agrifolia) in gardens, being a drought-tolerant understory not requiring summer watering that can endanger the trees. It is also planted in landscapes for slope stabilization and erosion control, due to its deep and dense network of roots.

Cultivars
Cultivars are grown, with different foliage color and texture aesthetic variations, they include:
Festuca californica 'Serpentine Blue' — blue grey-green.
Festuca californica 'River House Blues' (Ron's California Fescue) — chalky blue.
Festuca californica 'Gabilan Blues' —  shiny light blue.
Festuca californica 'San Rafael Blue' — silver blue-green.
Festuca californica 'Blue Fountain' - Suncrest Nurseries — chalky blue.

Restoration
In ecological restoration projects, Festuca californica is used with other local native grasses for restoring California coastal prairie habitats.

See also
Native grasses of California
List of California native plants

References

External links

CalFlora Database: Festuca californica (California fescue) 
 Jepson eFlora-TJM2 — Festuca californica
USDA Plants Profile for Festuca californica (California fescue)
Festuca californica — U.C. Photo gallery

californica
Bunchgrasses of North America
Native grasses of California
Grasses of the United States
Flora of California
Flora of Oregon
Flora of the Cascade Range
Flora of the Sierra Nevada (United States)
Flora of the Klamath Mountains
Natural history of the California chaparral and woodlands
Natural history of the California Coast Ranges
Natural history of the San Francisco Bay Area
Natural history of the Transverse Ranges
Garden plants of North America
Drought-tolerant plants
Flora without expected TNC conservation status